Hyde Park is a hamlet in Otsego County, New York, United States. Hyde Park is served by ZIP code 13807.

References

Hamlets in Otsego County, New York
Hamlets in New York (state)